My Leopold is a 1955 West German comedy film directed by Géza von Bolváry and starring Paul Hörbiger, Peer Schmidt, and Ingeborg Körner. It is based on Adolphe L'Arronge's 1873 play of the same name which has been turned into a number of films. It was shot at the Tempelhof Studios in West Berlin. The film's sets were designed by the art director Hans Kuhnert.

Cast

References

Bibliography

External links 
 

1955 films
West German films
German comedy films
1955 comedy films
1950s German-language films
German films based on plays
Films directed by Géza von Bolváry
German black-and-white films
Constantin Film films
Films shot at Tempelhof Studios
1950s German films